Meston is a family name.  It may refer to:

 Alexander Meston (1898–1980), English cricketer
 Archibald Meston (1851–1924), Australian explorer
 Baron Meston, title in the Peerage of the United Kingdom
 James Meston, 1st Baron Meston (1865-1943), British civil servant, financial expert and businessman
 Cindy Meston, Canadian clinical psychologist and professor
 Daja Wangchuk Meston (born 1970), American author and Tibet activist
 John Meston (1914–1979), American radio and television writer
 Petrie Meston (1916-1963), provincial politician from Alberta, Canada
 Robert Meston, 19th-century Australian politician
 Sam Meston (1882-1960), English cricketer
 Sammy Meston (1902–1953), English professional footballer
 Samuel Meston (1872–1948), English professional footballer, father of Sammy
 Stanley Clark Meston (1910-1992), American architect
 William Meston (1688?–1745), Scottish poet